Carlos Tavares (born 14 August 1958) is a Portuguese businessman. He is the chief executive officer (CEO) of Stellantis, the world's sixth largest automaker by sales, formed by the merger of the PSA Group and Fiat Chrysler Automobiles. He was formerly the chief operating officer at Renault.

Early life

Family 
Carlos Tavares was born in 1958 in Lisbon, his father was an accountant working for a French insurer and his mother was a French teacher. His passion for cars came at the age of 14 when he discovered motor racing, during an open day at the Estoril circuit, near Lisbon.

Education 
After studying at the Lycée français Charles-Lepierre in Lisbon, he left his native country for France at the age of 17 to follow a preparatory course in maths at the Lycée Pierre-de-Fermat in Toulouse. He then graduated as an engineer from the École Centrale Paris in 1981.

Career

Renault
Tavares started his career at Renault in 1981. He was director of the Renault Mégane II project.

Between 2004 and 2011, he worked for Nissan, Renault's partner in the Renault–Nissan Alliance (now Renault–Nissan–Mitsubishi Alliance), first as programme director and then as vice-president, product strategy and product planning. In 2005 Tavares was appointed executive vice-president, joining the board of directors. By 2009, he oversaw Nissan's presence in North and South America.

By 2011, he moved back to Renault to become chief operating officer, the number two executive under Carlos Ghosn, the chairman and chief executive officer of Renault and Nissan. Tavares had much in common with Ghosn, as both were "raised in Portuguese-speaking environments. Both went on to graduate from French Grandes Ecoles and - perhaps less surprisingly - both like fast cars." However, on August 15, 2013, Tavares said publicly that he wanted to become CEO at an automaker. It was said that Tavares was ambitious and sought more responsibilities at Renault, however Ghosn was only four years older and had no plans to step aside soon. Reportedly, Ghosn demanded that Tavares apologize to staff for the gaffe and Tavares refused. Instead he resigned from Renault on August 29, 2013.

PSA Group
Tavares became chief executive officer and Chairman of the Managing Board of Groupe PSA in 2014, replacing . During his tenure, he spearheaded cost-cutting measures and increased the company's market share in China, which returned Groupe PSA back to profitability after several years of losses. In 2014, under his leadership, DS Automobiles was established as a stand-alone brand.

As CEO, he gathered praise for the PSA take over of Opel and return to profitability of Opel, and for PSA's record sales and profits. However, PSA sales in China slipped again. Furthermore, he instigated the merger of PSA with Fiat Chrysler Automobiles.

Stellantis
In January 2021, Groupe PSA merged with Fiat Chrysler Automobiles to form Stellantis. Tavares became the first CEO. At Stellantis' first press conference, Tavares said he planed to save 5 billion euros a year in terms of investment, sharing of engines and platforms, and development. He also announced that he wanted to relaunch the most fragile brands, which could benefit from new investments.

During the 2022 French presidential election, incumbent President Emmanuel Macron and opposing candidate Marine Le Pen both called Tavares' 2021 compensation package – around 19 million euros ($20.5 million), plus a stock package worth some additional 32 million euros and long-term compensation of about 25 million euros – "shocking".

Other activities
 Airbus, Member of the Board of Directors (since 2016)
 Total, Member of the Board of Directors (between 2017 and 2020)

Personal life
Tavares is married and father of three children. He is also known to be close to the former Prime Minister of Portugal José Sócrates.

Racing driver 
Passionate about cars, he already volunteered at the age of 14 to be a track marshal on the Estoril circuit. He has been an amateur racing driver since the age of twenty-two.

In 1983, he started as a driver in rallies and endurance races with his friends Bruno Cébile, as co-driver, and Arnaud Montagné, as technical assistant. He notably participated in the Monte-Carlo Rally and he has his own team Clementeam Racing, by analogy with his daughter's first name.

In 2014, together with Jean-Louis Daughter, Denis Gibaud and Jérôme Maudet, Carlos Tavares won the A2 class of the Barcelona 24 Hours with a Peugeot RCZ Cup operated by Milan Competition.

He also collects classic cars and owns a Peugeot 504 V6 Coupé from 1979, an Alpine A110 from 1976 and a Porsche 912 from 1966.

He is a member of the jury at the Chantilly Arts & Elegance Richard Mille 2017 and 2019, an automobile elegance competition.

References

1958 births
Living people
Lycée Pierre-de-Fermat alumni
École Centrale Paris alumni
Portuguese businesspeople
Renault people
Stellantis
People from Lisbon
Portuguese chief executives
24H Series drivers
Portuguese racing drivers